Anastasia Aleksandrovna Lagina (born 11 August 1995) is a Russian handball player for Handball Club Lada and the Russian national handball team.

She represented Russia at the 2019 World Women's Handball Championship.

References

External links

Russian female handball players
1995 births
Living people
Sportspeople from Yaroslavl